The Humber Comedy Program was founded in 1999, at Humber College in Toronto, Ontario, Canada. Courses include stand-up, improvisation, scriptwriting, sketch comedy, and business aspects of the profession.  The program features many mainstage class shows, a weekly Humber student show at Yuk Yuk's Comedy Club, and an organized showcase at Second City Toronto for scouts, directors, and agents with students included on the basis of merit.

History 

It was preceded in 1997 by an annual one-week intensive, created by Joe Kertes, called The Humber Comedy Workshop. Anne Beatts, Lorne Frohman, Joe Flaherty, George Shapiro, Carol Leifer, and Stephen Rosenfield were guests in this program in 1998.

At various points, instructors have included Robin Duke and Paul O'Sullivan. 

Lorne Michaels has credited this program for his top talents when it comes to Saturday Night Live.

Alumni
Marty Adams
Rebecca Addelman
Ashley Comeau
Kurtis Conner
Debra DiGiovanni
Dini Dimakos
Sam Easton
Nathan Fielder
Ajay Fry
Richard LeBlanc
Karl Ludwig
Jeff McEnery
Nikki Payne
Renee Percy
Norm Sousa, Never Ever Do This at Home

References

External links 
 Humber College Comedy
 Humber Etcetera - the Humber College newsletter
 SUN Career Connection: Comedy students get the last laugh
 
 
 
 
 
 
 
 https://www.straight.com/news/825711/humber-colleges-school-creative-and-performing-arts-offers-musical-smorgasbord-students
 https://web.archive.org/web/20151018025405/http://thescenemagazine.ca/humber-college-rejects-taste-failsauce/
 https://www.theglobeandmail.com/report-on-business/careers/management/so-a-bay-street-executive-walks-into-a-comedy-club/article25091668/

Humber College
Canadian comedy
Performing arts education in Canada